Dr. Draw is the stage moniker of Eugene Draw, a Canadian experimental electric violinist based in Toronto, Ontario. Dr. Draw often plays with his band composed of a guitarist, an electronic keyboardist, an electric harpist, an electric cellist, a rock bassist, and a drummer.  Performing in many parts of the world led him to develop a musical style which blends elements of classical violin, jazz-rock fusion, folk and pop.

Early life
Draw moved with his family from Moscow to Toronto when he was nine years old. He attended the Royal Conservatory of Music, but did not graduate.

Career
Draw busked in Toronto as a teenager, and then began entertaining in clubs and bars, performing rock and electronic  music. He developed an energetic stage show which crossed into many genres of music.

In 2003, Draw released his first album, The City. A second album, Train 64, was released in 2006; it was named after the Via Rail train route between Montreal and Toronto.
 
Dr. Draw performed in Singapore and at a number of Louis Vuitton events in Hong Kong, Malaysia, and South Korea. He then recorded a third album, Adagio, which was released in 2007, and toured in Canada to support it.

Draw represented Canada at the World Expo in Shanghai, China in the summer of 2010.

Discography
 The City (2003)
 Train 64 (2006) 
 Adagio (2007)
 Distinctively Unclassified (2008)

Band members
As of Spring, 2023:
Eugene Draw – Violin
Jeff-Antoine Cote - Drums
Colin James Gibson – Guitar
Michael McDonnell – Bass

See also

Music of Canada
Canadian rock
List of Canadian musicians
List of bands from Canada
:Category:Canadian musical groups

References

External links
 Dr. Draw official website
 Dr. Draw biography at Maple Music

Musical groups established in 2005
Canadian indie rock groups
Canadian electronic music groups
Musical groups from Toronto
2005 establishments in Ontario
Fontana North artists